The Billabong Pipeline Masters 2015 is an event of the Association of Surfing Professionals for 2015 ASP World Tour.

This event will be held from 8 to 20 May at Banzai Pipeline, (Hawaii, United States) and opposed by 36 surfers.

Round 1

Round 2

Round 3

Round 4

Round 5

Quarter finals

Semi finals

Final

References

External links
 2015 Pipe Masters official event website

Billabong Pipe Masters
2015 World Surf League
2015 in sports in Hawaii
2015 in American sports
May 2015 sports events in Oceania